State Road 453 (SR 453), part of the Wekiva Parkway system, is a limited access toll road built and maintained by the Central Florida Expressway Authority (CFX). SR 453 connects SR 429 to SR 46, and it opened on March 31, 2018.

Route description
SR 453 heads northwest–southeast from interchange 39 on SR 429 to a loop interchange with SR 46 near Mount Dora as a spur route of SR 429. There is a toll plaza between the Lake County line and the SR 46 interchange. There are no planned intermediate exits.

History
SR 453 opened on March 31, 2018.

Exit list

See also
 Central Florida Expressway Authority
 Florida State Road 429

References

External links

 SR 453 – Central Florida Expressway Authority
 Wekiva Parkway – Central Florida Expressway Authority

453
453
453
Apopka, Florida
Mount Dora, Florida